Abdoul Zanne (born 18 February 2003) is an Ivorian professional footballer who plays as a midfielder for Loudoun United, on loan from ASEC Mimosas.

Career
On 1 April 2022, Zanne signed on a season-long loan with USL Championship side Loudoun United from ASEC Mimosas, where he played with the club's reserve team. After playing with Loudoun, Zanne earned a short-term loan deal with Loudoun's Major League Soccer parent club D.C. United on 16 July 2022. He appeared for D.C. United on the same day, entering in the 87th–minute during a 2–0 loss away to Minnesota United.

Career statistics

Club

Notes

References

2003 births
Living people
Association football midfielders
ASEC Mimosas players
D.C. United players
Expatriate soccer players in the United States
Ivorian expatriate footballers
Ivorian expatriate sportspeople in the United States
Ivorian footballers
Loudoun United FC players
Major League Soccer players
USL Championship players